Rhythmbox is a free and open-source audio player software, tag editor and music organizer for digital audio files on Linux and Unix-like systems. 

Rhythmbox is designed to work well under GNOME, but can function on other desktop environments. It is very scalable, able to handle libraries with tens of thousands of songs with ease. It provides a full feature set including full support for Unicode, fast but powerful tag editing, and a variety of plug-ins.

Rhythmbox is the default audio player on many Linux distributions including Fedora, Ubuntu since v12.04 LTS, and Linux Mint as of version 18.1.

Features
Rhythmbox offers a significant number of features, including:

Music playback
Playback from a variety of digital music sources is supported. The most common playback is music stored locally as files on the computer (the 'Library'). Rhythmbox supports playing streamed Internet radio and podcasts as well. The ReplayGain standard is also supported. Rhythmbox also supports searching of music in the library.

Playlists may be created to group and order music. Users may also create 'smart playlists,' ones that are automatically updated (like a database query) based on a customized rule of selection criteria rather than an arbitrary list of tracks. Music may be played back in shuffle (random) mode or repeat mode.

Track ratings are supported and used by the shuffle mode algorithm to play higher-rated tracks more often.

Gapless playback
Enabling the crossfading backend option with a duration of 0.0 switches Rhythmbox into gapless playback mode for music formats that support it. Gapless playback is not enabled by default.

Music importing
 Audio CD ripping
 Comprehensive audio format support through GStreamer
 iPod support
 Android support

Audio CD burning
Since the 0.9 release, Rhythmbox can create audio CDs from playlists.

Album cover display
Since the 0.9.5 release, Rhythmbox can display cover art of the currently playing album. The plugin can search the internet to find corresponding artwork, and as of 0.12.6, can read artwork from ID3 tags. If an image file is saved in the same directory as the audio track this is used instead.

SoundCloud
Rhythmbox can browse and play sounds from SoundCloud, via built-in SoundCloud plugin.

Song lyrics display
Since the 0.9.5 release, Rhythmbox can provide song lyrics of the currently playing song by pressing [ctrl + L], as long as the lyrics are stored in a lyrics database.

Audio scrobbling
Rhythmbox can submit played songs info to a remote scrobbling service. This information is used by the remote service to provide user specific music recommendations. Rhythmbox currently supports three scrobbling services:
 Last.fm 
 Libre.fm, the open-source drop-in replacement
 ListenBrainz

Music can be scrobbled to all services at the same time.

DAAP music sharing
Rhythmbox supports sharing music and playing shared music on local network via DAAP sharing plugin. The plugin uses libdmapsharing to provide this feature.

Devices
Rhythmbox uses the Linux udev subsystem to detect player devices.

Podcasting
Rhythmbox can subscribe to podcasts from the iTunes Store, Miroguide.com or by manually providing a podcast feed URL. Subsequently, new podcasts are automatically downloaded and available from the Library under the section Podcasts.

Web remote control
Rhythmbox can be controlled remotely with a Web browser, via inbuilt Web remote control plugin.

Plug-ins
Rhythmbox has a plug-in API for C, Python, or Vala.

There are nearly 50 third party plug-ins for Rhythmbox. including a 10 Band audio Equalizer, and many official plug-ins including:

 Cover art search
 Audio CD Player
 Last.fm / Libre.fm / Listenbrainz
 DAAP Music Sharing
 FM Radio
 Grilo media browser
 IM Status
 Internet Radio Streaming
 Song Lyrics
 Magnatune Store
 Media Player Keys
 Portable Players (generic, iPod)
 Android devices (via MTP)
 Notification
 Power Manager
 Python Console (for debugging)
 LIRC
 Send tracks
 Replay Gain
 MediaServer2 D-Bus interface
 MPRIS D-Bus interface
 Browser to integrate Rhythmbox with iTunes
 CD/DVD burning based on Brasero

Integration

Rhythmbox has been extensively integrated with a number of external programs, services and devices including:

 Built-in support for Multimedia Keys on keyboard
 Nautilus file manager context-menu integration, "hover mode" playback in Nautilus
 HexChat, via a HexChat plugin.
 Pidgin-Rhythmbox automatically updates the Pidgin user profile with details of the currently playing track
 Gajim and Pidgin include options for automatically updating the user status with details of currently playing track
 aMSN and emesene can change the user's personal message to current track via the "music" plugin (aMSN) and the "CurrentSong" plugin (emsene), similar to Messenger Plus! Live
 Music Applet (previously known as the Rhythmbox Applet), a GNOME panel applet that provides Rhythmbox playback controls from within the panel. Music Applet has since been superseded by Panflute
 Rhythmlet, another gDesklet that retrieves album art locally or from Amazon.com, has configurable display strings, playback controls, editable ratings and a seek bar
 SideCandyRhythmbox, a gDesklet-based Rhythmbox control and SideCandy display
 Rhythmbox XSLT allows the music library to be viewed as a web page
 Drivel inserts the name of the track Rhythmbox is currently playing into a LiveJournal blog entry
 Rhythmbox Tune Publisher publishes the currently playing Rhythmbox track to XMPP via the User Tune protocol (used by the Jabber World Map)
 FoxyTunes, a Mozilla Firefox extension that provides Rhythmbox playback controls from within the web browser
 Plugins for browsing and listening to Creative Commons licensed albums from Jamendo ( via grilo plugin ) and Magnatune.
 Rhythmbox Remote helps to remotely control Rhythmbox through an Android powered device.
 Rhythmbox WebMenu is a fully personalizable plugin that integrates Rhythmbox with several music websites.

Version history

See also

 Software audio players (free and open-source)
 List of feed aggregators
 Comparison of feed aggregators

References

External links

 Rhythmbox website

2001 software
Applications using D-Bus
Audio player software that uses GTK
Free audio software
Free media players
Free software programmed in C
GNOME Applications
Jukebox-style media players
Linux media players
Online music database clients
Software that uses GStreamer
Tag editors for Linux
Tag editors that use GTK